Tuborg is a Danish brewing company founded in 1873 on a harbour in Hellerup, an area North of Copenhagen, Denmark. Since 1970 it has been part of the Carlsberg Group. The brewery's flagship, the Tuborg pilsner, was brewed for the first time in 1880.

History 
The name Tuborg comes from Thuesborg ("Thue's castle"), a Copenhagen inn from the 1690s situated in the area of the brewery. This evolved and was adopted into local placenames, such as Lille Tuborg and Store Tuborg. Tuborgvej in Copenhagen is named after the site of the original Tuborg brewery.

Philip Heyman (5 November 1837 – 15 December 1893) was a Danish-Jewish industrialist who co-founded in 1873 the Tuborg Brewery, together with C. F. Tietgen, Gustav Brock [da] and Rudolph Puggaard. After Heyman's death, the Tuborg Brewery merged with "De Forenede Bryggerier" in 1894, which through this way entered into a profit-sharing agreement with Carlsberg in 1903. In the company, after the founder's death, the CEO was his Jewish son-in-law, Benny Dessau, and was then run by his widow and also his son Aage Philip Heyman.

During the Occupation

During the Occupation, because of his Jewish background, Einar Dessau had to flee to Sweden in November 1943, where he joined the resistance work. After the war, he resumed his position at Tuborg.
 

 
In the last year of the war, Tuborg's boiler house became the 5. January blown up at schalburgtage, but beer deliveries could still be continued the next day thanks to outside help.

Outside of Denmark, Tuborg's export beer is a well-known brand. Local production also takes place. The Tuborg brand is particularly strong in the eastern European markets. In 2000, Tuborg was represented on 104 markets worldwide, primarily with Guld Tuborg.

 
The Pilsner Grøn Tuborg is one of Denmark's most popular beers, and the international version of the beer also does well in around 70 countries, especially Turkey, Sweden and Germany and a total growth of 17% in 2006. April 2007, Tuborg was launched on the competitive British market. Tuborg is the largest licensed beer brand in Russia.
 
In Denmark, Tuborg is brewed by Carlsberg Denmark, and is available in approximately 10 types, while abroad it is mostly only covered by Gold Tuborg and Green Tuborg.

Beers
Tuborg sells a variety of beers in over 31 countries. These varieties include Tuborg Green, Tuborg Classic, Tuborg Summer, Tuborg Lemon, Tuborg Christmas beer, Tuborg Gold, Tuborg Red, Tuborg Twist, Tuborg Tropical, Tuborg Black, Malta and Tuborg Fine Festival.

Tuborg Green

Tuborg Green has been produced since 1880, and is the best-selling beer among young people in Denmark. It was the country's first "real" lager.

Grøn Tuborg / The Great Tuborg / Premium
Introduced in 1880 as the first pilsner beer in Denmark. In 1915, the label was given a crown on top, on the occasion that the brewery had become Kgl. Court supplier.
The Tubor'gram, informative and entertaining neck labels, were introduced in 1958. They gave Grøn Tuborg the nickname "the high school boy".

On 28 September 1970, the festive Perikles tins went on sale in Denmark.

The changes on the Tuborg Grøn label are happening slowly but surely. During the spring of 1996, the Green label was changed. The chest label is now printed in silver on the crown and on the finishing edge around the green, as is the "name plate" finish and the typography has been tightened up.

The next tightening took place in 2002 in connection with the reintroduction of the can.

After approximately four years, when the middle background has been moved in, the "Tuborg" background is opened again towards the sides of the label in 2006. At the same time, silver edges have been added. But the most surprising thing is that the old label, where Tog F is written together, has again had a renaissance - both on the neck and chest label, and also on foreign labels (2005). The green waves of the Danish neck label have also been straightened out and replaced by straight lines.

Green Organic
Introduced in 2022.

RAW
Began as a festival beer on tap. In 2015, in a can and later also in a bottle in pubs.

Tuborg Classic

Tuborg Classic was introduced to the market on 1 February 1993 to mark the brewery's 120th anniversary. The beer is a darker pilsner type with 4.6% alcohol, which is marketed with the slogan "A little more of everything..." The product was a success and has been part of the product range ever since and is today one of Tuborg's best-selling brands in Denmark.

Tuborg Gold
Tuborg Gold is a strong lager with an alcohol strength of 5.6%. The beer was originally developed for export and was launched in Denmark in 1895.

Tuborg Gold - Tuborg Beer - Gold Tuborg - The golden lady
Sold in Denmark since 1895. Brewed on pilsner malt. The first cans were delivered on 15 July 1954 for export according to Tuborg Posten Oct. 1954 page 10.

From the 1950s, The Golden Lady was marketed by Danish models. Among them was Anette Strøyberg (1936-2005).

The line between Tuborg and Beer has been in one or two. Here, Arne Dahl has made two proposals from which you could choose.

Tuborg Christmas-brew

Tuborg Julebryg saw the light of day in 1981. It is a darker and slightly stronger beer (5.6% alcohol) than the traditional lager and Tuborg Christmas brew comes in a dark version and also in a light version (5.6% alcohol). Marketing and image are everything for Tuborg Christmas brew, which is also known colloquially as the snowman. A whole tradition has grown up around the day of the arrival of this year's Christmas brew. The day is called J-day or the day "the snow falls". Tuborg Julebryg is still one of the most popular Christmas brews in Denmark, even though in blind tests it is always placed among the worst scoring beers, and still loses market share to the smaller breweries. Tuborg Julebryg was originally a mixture of KB Juleøl, Rød Tuborg and Fine Festival and was introduced because in 1979 Tuborg introduced its now well-known snow universe on a Christmas card for ordinary Green Tuborg with the slogan "Merry Christmas and good Tub'år". In 1980, the image was used as a poster on beer trucks and in 1981 as a label for the newly launched Christmas beer, Tuborg Christmas brew, which is known from the cinema advertisement with Santa Claus in the can.

Julebryg - Snebajer / Christmas Brew
Introduced 1981. Originally a mixture of KB Juleøl, Rød Tuborg and FF. The beer was introduced because an advertisement featuring Santa Claus in a can was shown in the cinemas the year before. The commercial became so popular that Tuborg decided to make a beer with a label that resembled the universe from the commercial.
Plaque bottle introduced 2001, blue plastic bottle introduced 2002
Exported or licensed brewed in Russia, Germany and Romania, among others.

Weihnachts-Pilsener
Introduced with a label similar to the Danish Julebryg, but the strength is not the same.

Summer
Beer mix. Launched in the summer 2013.

Tuborg Red

Rød Tuborg was the very first beer Tuborg Bryggerierne produced. It hit the streets for the first time in 1875. The beer was originally sold as "Lagerøl", but was popularly called "Red", which at some point became the beer's official name.

Rød Tuborg is produced in accordance with the original recipe as a dark bottom-fermented beer from four types of malt: Munich, Pilsner, caramel and colored malt. No raw fruit is used in the beer. Today it has an alcohol strength of 4.3%.

Due to falling sales, Rød Tuborg was taken out of production in 2002, but relaunched in May 2007 to mark the brewery's birthday. The beer has since been sent to stores in May to mark the birthday.

Tuborg Red was the first beer brewed by the company, in 1875. Tuborg Red is not brewed regularly but is produced once each May to salute the company's birthday. The brewery has distributed Tuborg Squash since 1936.

Red - lager
The beer type has been sold in Denmark since 1875.
Brewed from a large proportion of Munich malt as well as pilsner malt, caramel malt and colored malt.

The first brew hit the streets on 13 July 1875. In 1923, the name Rød was added, but the chest label was still called Lager Øl. According to the book "Tuborg Øl" on the occasion of the brewery's 100th birthday in 1973, Tuborg had in 1924 developed a new lager product - the red Tuborg, so the question is whether Red Tuborg is exactly the same as Lager Øl from before 1923.

Rød Tuborg was released as a regular commercial beer in 2002. Reintroduced on 27 April 2007 on the occasion of Tuborg Brewery's birthday. However, only in limited quantities and with the plan to be on the market for a month. It can conceivably be continued as a birthday beer every April-May.

Also sold in Israel and Italy under the name Red Label.

Tuborg Blue
Tuborg Blue introduced 6 February 2007. Dark fruity beer with caramel notes and only a slight bitterness from the hops. Added aromas and caramel color. Launched together with Tuborg White.

Tuborg White
Tuborg White introduced 6 February 2007. Pale ale inspired beer with a fresh taste of citrus and flowers from the hops. Added aroma. Launched together with Tuborg Blue.

Chr. 4
In the trade 1 February 1988. On the occasion of Chr. 4's 400 year government anniversary.
Brewed on top yeast and white malt. 4.3% (weight percentage).

Golden Classic
Officially introduced April 26, 2004. Brewed on a cascade hop that can give a citrusy flavor. The taste is rounded off with brewing syrup. Caramel malt gives the dark color. Phase-out began spring 2007.

Classic Wheat
Introduced officially April 2, 2002, but in stores already March 29. Phase-out began spring 2007.

Copenhagen Pride
On the occasion of Copenhagen Pride 15 - 20 August 2017.

Dark Special
Import to Belgium in 1987.

Denmark Pilsener - Tuborg
Export to the USA.

Red
Italy and Israel.

Non Alcoholic
Arne Dahl design for Arab countries.

Royal Export
United Romanian Breweries.

Rinse
Beer mix. Bought in France.

Special Beer, ÖZEL BIRA
Brewed since 1955 in Turkey.

Tuborg
Brewed under license by Pripps in Sweden.

Tuborg Dark
Tuborg Dark and Tuborg Dark Special.

Tuborg Beer Extra Strong
Tuborg Extra Strong label 1899 and 1900.

A Switch
Label made for Danish Beer Collectors. Came in connection with the association's Christmas lunch in Risskov on 25 November 2006. There are only 60 copies. There are no loose labels.

Cheer Brew
Brewed on the occasion of Tuborg's 100th anniversary in 1973.

Cheer Beer
25th anniversary of the Carlsberg Tuborg civil service association. The name has previously been used by Tuborg in connection with the 25th anniversary of Tuborgs Factories.

Calendar Pilsner
Introduced November 5, 2004. Was not on the market in 2005.

Lime Cut
Introduced in the spring 2010.

Tuborg Easter-brew
Paskebryg is also a seasonal beer with its own very special tradition and day associated with it: P-day, which admittedly does not reach the same heights as J-day. Tuborg Påskebryg, also called Kylle-kylle, is a golden and slightly sweet beer with an alcohol strength of 5.4%.

Easter brew - Kylle Kylle - The golden blonde
On the market in 1906 as draft beer. Introduced in bottle in 1931. Discontinued 1940 due to World War II.
After a 12-year absence, Tuborg Paaskebryg came back into business on March 26, 1952. First year with low oval label (16). The TF brand was above the name Paaske Bryg.
Only the following year is it called "The golden blonde".
The golden blonde label was introduced in 1953, label 15A. The taste should be roughly the same as at Tuborg Jubelbryg from the 75th anniversary in 1948.
Paaske Bryg, Højoval label (16) Easter 1954 with neck label "Den gyldenblonde" Tuborg-KB Posten No 25 page 20.
In 1955, "Tuborg" is written on the neck.
In 1956, the label again becomes a low oval (15) and the TF label is moved under Paaske Bryg. On the neck, this year is the 50th anniversary mark.
In 1994, the beer changes its name to Kylle Kylle and becomes a kl. A beer. Kylle Kylle disappears after a few years, and the beer is again called Påskebryg.

Got the name Kylle Kylle in 1994, at the same time it became a class A beer of 5.7 percent against 7.8 before. Later, the name Påskebryg came back, but the low alcohol percentage was maintained.

Tuborg Fine Festival
Fine Festival, or simply FF, is a strong lager with an alcohol strength of 7.5. The beer was introduced in 1955 on the occasion of Queen Elizabeth's coronation.

Fine Festival - FF
Introduced as an export beer on the occasion of the coronation of the English Queen Elizabeth II on 5 December 1952. Came to the market in Denmark in 1955. The main malt is pilsner malt.

In 1957, you see advertisements with FF in all four colours, red, blue, yellow and green.

The 50th anniversary of the introduction was celebrated with a new label in 2003. Shortly after, the name Tuborg was largely removed from the beer. Tuborg was removed from the center of the label and from the wrap. Only a short address in Hellerup remained. A few years later it also disappeared, now in 2007 only a web address www.tuborg.dk remains. However, the Tuborg name came back on the beer.

Greenland-Brew
Introduced 15 November 1954 on the occasion of SAS's new route from Copenhagen via Greenland to Los Angeles. Tuborg Posten dec. 1954. The Stubby bottle is newer and made for the Greenlandic market, designed by Arne Dahl.

Tuborg Zero
Tuborg Nul is an non-alcoholic beer lager. Tuborg zero introduced in 2020. Tuborg zero was made for young peoples, so they don’t drink too much alcohol and it was also made for replace the three other alcohol-free beers that the brewery has also made before exactly Tuborg LITE, Tuborg Super Light and Tuborg Light beers. Tuborg Nul includes: Tuborg Nul  original, Tuborg Nul Mango and Passion-fruit and Tuborg Nul Citrus.

Tuborg Super Light
Super Light is an alcohol-free lager (0.1%) brewed like Grøn Tuborg, but with subsequent removal of the alcohol. It was introduced in 1993.

Non-alcoholic beer. Introduced September 1993. Brewed on pilsner malt. After fermentation, the alcohol is removed by an evaporation process that takes place under vacuum. Introduced in cans in 2005.

Tuborg LITE
In 2008, Tuborg tried to develop a light beer that was marketed as Tuborg Lite with an alcohol strength of 0.5%. At the launch, the brewery had high expectations for the new beer type, but the beer did not catch on and is no longer produced.

LITE Carlsberg/Tuborg introduced this new type of beer in May 2008. There is 30 per cent. fewer calories than in a regular lager.

Tuborg ULTRA green
Tuborg ultra green was a beer produced by Tuborg, which was sold in an oblong 33 cl can and with an alcohol percentage of 6.5. It was launched in the summer of 2013, but did not achieve the expected sales and is no longer manufactured.

Light beer
Arne Dahl's design proposal for a Light Beer can. The proposal is a piece of paper placed on a Carlsberg can.

Light Tuborg - Light Green - Light Green - Light
In 1992, Lys Tuborg was replaced by Tuborg Light, which became a lager instead of a white beer.

Mumme
Introduced 15 March 1951. A strong export beer type in the luxury class (The history can be found in Tuborg KB Posten no. 6 1951). Discontinued March 31, 1957.
Brunsviger Mumme was originally a German beer variety. It was brewed in the 14th century in Braunschweig. It was a thick, sweet and heavily spiced beer. It could have added cinnamon, cardamom, cloves, buttercup and cherry juice.

Porter - Stout
First on the market in 1907. Was gone during WWII. Was reintroduced on Sept. 1, 1951. The alcohol percentage was approximately 6% abv.
Advertised in Danmarks Handels Tidende dec1954. Label 15,A.

However, Tuborg Porter was already introduced shortly after the war, but only for export and under the name Tuborg Stout.

Lemon Porter
A mixture of porter and lemon water, introduced on 1 April 1997, had only a short time on the market.
Mentioned in CT Magasinet June 1997.

Royal Brew
The Danish royal couple Frederik IX and Ingrid visited Tuborg on 4 May 1957. The queen started this brew.

Royal Danish
Royal Denmark Brew was for several years used as a gift beer in Denmark. Tuborg presented depot owners and others with a case of this special beer.

Designer Arne Dahl made design proposals for Carlsberg and Tuborg for several years. Many times the first proposals were made as drawings on paper attached to existing cans with adhesive tape.

Royal Navy Brew
Originally brewed on the occasion of the coronation of Queen Elizabeth in England on 2 June 1953 in gratitude that England stood for the liberation of Denmark in 1945.

Season Brew
Published on the occasion of the turn of the millennium.

T-Beer
Introduced on 23 September 2002, at the same time as the re-introduction of cans in Denmark. Taken off the market 2003. The target group was the young. Reintroduced in a clear bottle in 2005.

Tuborg 2000
On the occasion of the turn of the millennium.

Vitz - Tuborg Shandy
In the trade 7 May 1984. Starting point in the brewing of an ordinary pilsner, which by adding flavoring substances - extracted from lime and citrus fruits - became a product with a low alcohol content.
Produced until mid-1985.

Marketing

Advertisement

In 1990 Tuborg launched their annual Christmas brew on the second Wednesday in November, with the marketing term "J-day"; "snestorm" (blizzard) and "snefald" (snowfall) are also used. 'J' stands for Jul (Christmas) or julebryg (Christmas brew). Similarly, there is a P-day for påskebryg (Easter brew). In 1999, J-day moved to the first Friday in November. Traffic police laid out an alcohol control plan for that evening. In 2009 J-day was moved again to the last Friday in October, but in 2010 it returned to the first Friday in November.

Sponsorships
In 2008, Tuborg announced a sponsorship deal with Reading and Leeds music festivals to become their exclusive Official Beer Partner, a position held in previous years by Carling. In 2009, it also arranged an exclusive deal with The Download festival to be the official beer and have a dedicated stage named after the beer.

Tuborg also sponsors the Tuborg Image Awards, an annual music award presentation that takes place in Nepal.

See also

 Philip Heyman

References

External links
 

Food and drink companies established in 1873
Danish brands
Breweries in Denmark
Multinational companies headquartered in Denmark
Purveyors to the Court of Denmark
Danish companies established in 1873
Carlsberg Group